Feel Good is a British comedy-drama television programme created by Mae Martin and Joe Hampson. It is a semi-autobiographical romantic comedy starring Mae Martin as a fictionalised version of themself and Charlotte Ritchie as Mae's girlfriend George.

The six-part programme premiered its first episode on Channel 4 in the United Kingdom on 18 March 2020, after which all six episodes were released on All 4. Netflix handled international distribution and released it internationally on 19 March 2020. Independently of Channel 4, Netflix renewed the series for a second and final season which was released on 4 June 2021.

Plot
The show follows the development of George and Mae's romance in contemporary Manchester. Mae (Mae Martin), a Canadian comedian (a version of Mae Martin's own personal life), meets George (Charlotte Ritchie), a repressed, middle-class English woman, at the comedy club where Mae performs. The pair begin dating, and George learns that Mae is a former drug addict. George encourages them to attend a Narcotics Anonymous meeting, where Mae meets fellow recovering addicts. Mae's addiction causes problems in their relationship, as does George's reluctance to come out and tell friends and family about her relationship with Mae.

In the second season Mae's career advances, while they address trauma in their past after receiving a diagnosis of post-traumatic stress disorder.

Cast and characters

Main
 Mae Martin as a fictionalised version of themself
 Charlotte Ritchie as Georgina "George" Lawson, Mae's girlfriend and a secondary school English teacher
 Lisa Kudrow as Linda Martin, Mae's mother

Recurring
 Phil Burgers as Phil, George's flatmate
 Adrian Lukis as Malcolm Martin, Mae's father
 Pippa Haywood as Felicity, George's mother
 Ophelia Lovibond (season 1) and Stephanie Leonidas (season 2) as Binky, George's best friend
 Tom Durant Pritchard as Hugh, Binky's husband
 Al Roberts as Jared, an unwelcome love interest
 Tobi Bamtefa as Nick, MC of the Gag Bin comedy club
 Jack Barry as Jack, a fellow comedian and Gag Bin regular
 Sophie Thompson as Maggie, Mae's Narcotics Anonymous (NA) self-declared sponsor (season 1)
 Ritu Arya as Lava (who goes by Laura), Maggie's daughter (season 1)
 Ramon Tikaram as David, NA leader (season 1)
 Tom Andrews as Kevin, NA member (season 1)
 Jordan Stephens as Elliott, George's colleague (season 2)
 John Ross Bowie as Scott, Mae's former housemate (season 2)
 Anthony Head as George's father (season 2)
 Steen Raskopoulos as Pete Lewis (season 1 and 2)

Episodes

Series 1 (2020)

Series 2 (2021)

Reception
On Rotten Tomatoes, season 1 has an approval rating of 100% based on reviews from 41 critics, with an average rating of 8.3 out of 10.

Caroline Framke of Variety wrote: "Feel Good feels lowkey, insightful and real in a way that so much of TV tries to be, but rarely achieves quite like this – and yes, it also can feel pretty damn good."

At the 2021 RTS Programme Awards, Martin and Hampson won Best Writer – Comedy.

Notes

References

External links
 
 
 

2020 British television series debuts
2021 British television series endings
2020s British comedy-drama television series
2020s British LGBT-related comedy television series
2020s British LGBT-related drama television series
2020s British romantic comedy television series
2020s romantic drama television series
Channel 4 comedy dramas
Lesbian-related television shows
English-language Netflix original programming
Television series about couples
Bisexuality-related television series
Television series by All3Media